In Australian politics, a leadership spill (or simply spill) is a colloquialism referring to a declaration that the leadership of a parliamentary party is vacant and open for contest. A spill may involve all or some of the leadership positions (leader and deputy leader in both houses). Where a rival to the existing leader calls for a spill it may also be called a leadership challenge. When successful, it is often said that the former leader has been "rolled". In Australian English the colloquial use of the word "spill" seems to have begun in the mid-1940s with the contest to replace Prime Minister John Curtin after his death on 5 July 1945.

When a leadership vacancy arises due to the voluntary resignation or death of the incumbent, the resulting leadership ballot may not be popularly called a leadership spill. For example, the 1968 Liberal Party leadership ballot after the disappearance of Harold Holt was not known as a leadership spill, despite the contest involving four candidates. If the party in question is in government, the election of a new leader will result in a new Prime Minister, Premier or Chief Minister; if the party is the opposition, the election of a new leader will result in a new Opposition Leader.

There were 72 leadership spills between 1970 and 2015; the phenomenon became increasingly common in the early 21st century. None occurred in the 1960s, 10 in the 1970s, 18 in the 1980s, 13 in the 1990s, and 31 between 2000 and 2015. Spills are three times more likely to occur when a party is in opposition compared to when it holds government. The frequent leadership spills and political instability in the 21st century – which saw five changes of Prime Ministers between 2010 and 2018 – has led to Australia being dubbed "coup capital of the democratic world".

Process
In the Westminster system of government, the leader of the party which forms government becomes the prime minister, while the leader of the largest party not in government becomes leader of the Opposition. Contenders for the role of leader of a major party usually (but not always) come from the cabinet or shadow cabinet.

A leadership spill occurs when a member or members of the parliamentary party feel that the leader is taking the party in an undesirable direction or is simply not delivering on promises made to those who elected the leader, and does not have the numbers to back his or her position. A spill may be triggered by consistently poor opinion polls.

A spill can be initiated by the party leader in office, usually in the hope of gaining a fresh mandate to quell dissenting voices in the party. It may occur at any time, leaving the person in the leadership position always 'on notice'.

Federal ALP changes
Following his return to the leadership of the Australian Labor Party in 2013, Prime Minister Kevin Rudd sought changes to the party's rules so that leadership spills would be more difficult to launch in future. The changes included the requirement for 75% support within the Australian Labor Party Caucus for a special leadership ballot against a sitting Labor prime minister, or 60% against an opposition leader. Another change was that  future leadership ballots would include equally weighted voting rights between the caucus and party rank and file members with each block being counted separately and worth 50% of the total.

The rule that a Labor prime minister can only be removed if 75 per cent of MPs agree to force a ballot (or 60 per cent of caucus for an opposition leader) is a caucus-approved rule and was not included in the 2018 National Platform.

Federal Liberal Party changes
Following the oustings of two Liberal Prime Ministers in 3 years, Scott Morrison, who won the leadership spill of 24 August 2018 introduced a new threshold to trigger a Liberal Party leadership change in government, requiring two-thirds of the partyroom vote to trigger a spill motion. The change was introduced at an hour long party room meeting on the evening of 3 December 2018. Morrison said the changes, which were drafted with feedback from former prime ministers John Howard and Tony Abbott, would only apply to leaders who lead the party to victory at a federal election.

Impact
Historically, a governing party's replacement of its leader fails to improve its electoral fortunes. Across state and federal politics between 1970 and 2014, over 90% of governing parties that replaced their leader lost their majority at the subsequent election. The chances of success are higher when the party is in opposition, leading to success at the subsequent election about 50% of the time.

Notable spill motions
The following spill motions occurred during a parliamentary term, rather than in the aftermath of an election loss. Colours denote the party holding the leadership spill motion. Blue represents the Liberal Party, red the Labor Party, and green the National Party.

Federal

States and territories

New South Wales

Northern Territory

Queensland

South Australia

Victoria

Western Australia

In popular culture
An episode of the American TV series Madam Secretary, "The Common Defense", featured a fictional Australian Prime Minister and one of the main characters Jay Whitman (Sebastian Arcelus) commented that Australia throws Prime Ministers out like confetti. The episode was originally aired on March 24, 2019, and it is an allusion to the real life frequency of Prime Ministers between 2010 and 2018 as a result of leadership spills against the sitting Prime Minister.

See also
 Leadership election
 Leadership review and Leadership convention – a very different process of choosing and removing the leader in Canada which involves the broader party membership

References

Further reading

 

Organizational structure of political parties
Parliamentary procedure
Political systems
Political science
 
Political terminology in Australia